E. J. Trivette (born June 6, 1936 in Deep Gap, North Carolina, USA) is a retired NASCAR Winston Cup Series driver.

Career
In his thirteen-year career, Trivette has raced 177 races and has accomplished twenty-nine finishes in the top ten. Trivette's average finish for his career was in 19th place while his average start for his career is 23rd place. Total earnings for this driver are $31,181 ($ when adjusted for inflation). Richmond International Raceway was Trivette's favorite course; with him finishing in 11th place on average. Most of his rocky finishes would come at Talladega Superspeedway where a 35th-place finish was routine.

Gary Baird was Trivette's sponsor for most of his career. Chevrolet and Ford would be the primary manufacturers that would provide vehicles for this driver during his career. Trivette would also try his hand at owning a NASCAR ride; he would end up competing in seven different races for himself.

Post-NASCAR career
His son Barry would eventually become the vice president and chassis designer for Baird & Trivette Racing (a company that E.J. Trivette would form with Gary Baird in 1982). Trivette now resides in the Ft. Myers, Florida area where his race car chassis manufacturing plant is located.

The business produces mainly for Late Model drivers and for GT (grand tourer) drivers.

References

1936 births
20th-century American businesspeople
21st-century American businesspeople
Living people
NASCAR drivers
NASCAR team owners
People from Deep Gap, North Carolina
Racing drivers from North Carolina